The 2023 season will be the Arizona Cardinals' upcoming 104th season in the National Football League and the first under new tandem head coach/general manager tandem of Jonathan Gannon and Monti Ossenfort. They will attempt to improve upon their 4-13 record from the previous year and make the playoffs after a 1 year absence.

Offseason changes

Head coach
The Cardinals fired fourth year head coach Kliff Kingsbury who led the Cardinals to playoffs in 2021. On February 14, 2023 the Cardinals hired former Philadelphia Eagles defensive coordinator Jonathan Gannon was named the new head coach.

General manager
Steve Keim will step down as general manager who spent tenth seasons, who most notably led the organization to draft such as D. J. Humphries, Haason Reddick, Budda Baker and Kyler Murray. On January 16, 2023 the Cardinals hired former Tennessee Titans director of player personnel Monti Ossenfort as their new general manager.

Draft

Notes

Staff

Current roster

Preseason
The Cardinals' preseason opponents and schedule will be announced in the spring.

Regular season

2023 opponents
Listed below are the Cardinals' opponents for 2023. Exact dates and times will be announced in the spring.

References

External links
 

Arizona
Arizona Cardinals seasons
Arizona Cardinals